Suryavamsam translates into English as "Lineage of the Sun god" or "Descendants of the Sun"

Suryavamsam may refer to:

Films
 Suryavamsam (1997 film) - 1997 Indian Tamil film
 Suryavamsam (1998 film) - 1998 Indian Telugu film
 Sooryavansham (1999 film) - 1999 Indian Hindi film

Television series
 Suryavamsam (TV series) - 2020 Indian Tamil (TV series)